The following is a list of official music videos that were set and primarily filmed in London, England.

Music videos set in London

See also

List of films set in London
List of television shows set in London
List of songs about London

References

 

London-related lists